Streitenberger Cliff is an abrupt rock and ice cliff 1.3 nautical miles (2.4 km) west of Reed Ridge, along the northwest margin of the Ford Massif in the Thiel Mountains, Antarctica.

The name was proposed by Peter Berrnel and Arthur Ford, co-leaders of the Thiel Mountains party which surveyed the area in 1960–61. It is named for Staff Sgt. Fred W. Streitenberger, United States Marine Corps (USMC), navigator of the Squadron VX-6 plane crew that flew the United States Geological Survey party into the Thiel Mountains, and also to several other mountain ranges during the summer of 1960–61.

References

Cliffs of Ellsworth Land